is a railway station in the town of  Mogami, Yamagata, Japan, operated by East Japan Railway Company (JR East).

Lines
Akakura-Onsen Station is served by the Rikuu East Line, and is located 61.6 rail kilometers from the terminus of the line at Kogota Station.

Station layout
Akakura-Onsen Station has one side platform, serving a single bidirectional track. The platform was originally an island platform, but there are no longer any tracks on one side. The station is unattended.

History
It was renamed  on November 15, 1954. The station was absorbed into the JR East network upon the privatization of JNR on April 1, 1987. It was renamed to its present name on December 4, 1999.

Surrounding area
 
Akakura Onsen
Uzen-Akakura Post Office

See also
List of railway stations in Japan

References

External links

 JR East Station information 

Railway stations in Yamagata Prefecture
Rikuu East Line
Railway stations in Japan opened in 1917
Mogami, Yamagata